ABNCoV2 is a cVLP COVID-19 vaccine candidate developed by Expres2ion Biotechnologies and Adaptvac, outlicensed to Bavarian Nordic.

On 9 August 2021, it was announced that the first round of trials of the vaccine had been finalized with good results among 45 test subjects.

References 

Clinical trials
Danish COVID-19 vaccines
Virus-like particle vaccines